Neil "George" Piller is an Australian professor of lymphology at the Department of Surgery, School of Medicine, Flinders University

Piller is also the Director of the Lymphoedema Assessment Unit, Flinders Surgical Oncology as well as member of the Flinders University  microcirculatory and lymphological research group. Piller's major interest is in the accurate diagnosis of, targeted treatment for and management of all forms of primary and secondary lymphoedema.

References

Lymphoedema
(Then click 'Show' to reveal the transcript)

External links
Faculty profile

Living people
Academic staff of Flinders University
Year of birth missing (living people)